Graeme John Lloyd (born 9 April 1967) is an Australian-born former professional baseball pitcher, who appeared with the Milwaukee Brewers, New York Yankees, Toronto Blue Jays, Montreal Expos, Florida Marlins, New York Mets, and Kansas City Royals of Major League Baseball (MLB).

Playing career
Lloyd played with the Milwaukee Brewers, New York Yankees, Toronto Blue Jays, and Kansas City Royals of the American League and the Montreal Expos, Florida Marlins, and New York Mets of the National League. He was the third native Australian so far to have pitched in Major League Baseball, .

Career overview
Lloyd was used exclusively as a relief pitcher during his ten years in the major leagues, ending his career with 30 wins against 36 losses, 17 saves, and 97 holds.

Later in his career, he added a palmball to his repertoire.

For much of his career, he was used as a left-handed specialist. This type of pitcher is used against an opposing team's star left-handed hitter(s) late in a game. Lloyd excelled in this role for the New York Yankees in 1998 when he posted a career-best 1.67 ERA. This effectiveness led to the Toronto Blue Jays demanding Lloyd be included in a package anchored by starting pitcher David Wells when the Yankees traded for Toronto starting pitcher Roger Clemens.

Lloyd became the first Australian-born baseball player to win a World Series in 1996 while playing for the New York Yankees who defeated the Atlanta Braves in a six-game series. Lloyd was awarded the win for Game 4 of the series, replacing Mariano Rivera in the ninth inning and inducing the left-handed batsman Fred McGriff to hit into an inning-ending double play.

Lloyd became a two-time World Series champion for the Yankees in 1998, defeating the San Diego Padres. Lloyd is still the only Australian-born baseball player to have won a World Series.

Lloyd missed the entire 2000 season while recovering from arthroscopic surgery. In 2001, he received the Tony Conigliaro Award, a national recognition instituted in 1990 by the Boston Red Sox to honor the memory of the late Tony Conigliaro, given annually to a Major League Baseball (MLB) player who best "overcomes an obstacle and adversity through the attributes of spirit, determination, and courage that were trademarks of Conigliaro."

International career
Lloyd represented his native Australia at the Olympic Games in Athens in 2004.

Personal
Lloyd's wife Cindy suffered from Crohn's disease, to which she succumbed in 2000 at the age of 26. In 2000 and 2001, Graeme acted as the spokesman for the Graeme Lloyd and Jon Mechanic Field of Dreams, a charity which was dedicated in the name of Cindy Lloyd.

He is currently the pitching coach for the Melbourne Aces of the Australian Baseball League.

See also
 List of players from Australia in Major League Baseball

References

External links

1967 births
Living people
Australian expatriate baseball players in Canada
Australian expatriate baseball players in the United States
Baseball players at the 2004 Summer Olympics
Dunedin Blue Jays players
Florida Marlins players
Kansas City Royals players
Knoxville Blue Jays players
Olympic baseball players of Australia
Olympic medalists in baseball
Olympic silver medalists for Australia
Major League Baseball pitchers
Major League Baseball players from Australia
Medalists at the 2004 Summer Olympics
Milwaukee Brewers players
Montreal Expos players
Myrtle Beach Blue Jays players
New York Mets players
New York Yankees players
Sportspeople from Geelong
Toronto Blue Jays players
Sport Australia Hall of Fame inductees